The Seven Sacraments Altarpiece is a fixed-wing triptych by the Early Netherlandish artist Rogier van der Weyden and his workshop. It was painted from 1445 to 1450, probably for a church in Poligny (Max J. Friedländer claimed that it was commissioned by the Bishop Jean Chevrot), and is now in the Royal Museum of Fine Arts, Antwerp. It depicts the seven sacraments of the Roman Catholic Church. On the left panel are baptism, confirmation and confession and on the right hand panel the ordination of a priest, marriage and the last rites. 

The central panel (possibly the only autograph part of the work) is dominated by a crucifixion in the foreground, with the sacrament of the Eucharist in the background. Angels hover over each sacrament with scrolls, with clothes colour-matched to the sacraments, from white for baptism to black for the last rites. The side panels also depict the altarpiece's commissioners, along with some portrait heads only added shortly before the work was completed. Two coats of arms (probably that of the commissioners) (left: "sable" chevron on "or" field; right: "argent" tower on "sable" field) are painted in the spandrels of the painting's inner frame.

References

Bibliography 
Felix Thürlemann: Rogier van der Weyden: Leben und Werk, C.H. Beck Wissen 2006, . 
Flügelaltäre : Caterina Limentani Virdis, Mari Pietrogiovanna, München, Hirmer, 2002, . 

Paintings by Rogier van der Weyden
Paintings in the collection of the Royal Museum of Fine Arts Antwerp
1445 paintings
1446 paintings
1447 paintings
1448 paintings
1449 paintings
1450 paintings
Paintings depicting the Crucifixion of Jesus
Angels in art
Paintings of the Virgin Mary
Triptychs
Churches in art